Setzingen is a village in the district of Alb-Donau in Baden-Württemberg in Germany.

Geography
Setzingen is located on the southern slope of the Swabian Jura on the outskirts of the Lone valley, about 5 kilometers north of Langenau and 20 kilometers northeast of Ulm.

Neighboring communities
The municipality borders to the Hausen district of the city Herbrechtingen, to the Heidenheim district, to the east to Öllingen, on the south by Nerenstetten and on the west by Ballendorf.

History
Setzingen is mentioned the first time in 1143 as the monastery Anhausen an der Brenz.

Religions
In Setzingen since the 12th century, there is a church. Since the reformation, the place is evangelical.

Military
In the forest area "Ballhart" northwest of Setzingen the Bundeswehr operates  an ammunition dump. On the site there is also a radio tower (55 m high) in reinforced concrete. (coordinates: 48 ° 33 '27 "N, 10 ° 6' 33" O).

Things

Buildings
The Bartholomew church in the center is worth seeing.  The baptismal bell from the 14th century and the wooden baptismal font from 1762 are also worth seeing.

Weblinks 

 Internetpräsenz der Gemeinde

References

Alb-Donau-Kreis
Württemberg